Rory Waterman (born in Belfast, 1981) is a poet, critic, editor and academic resident in Nottingham, England.

Early life
Waterman grew up mainly in a lodge house to an estate near Nocton, Lincolnshire with his mother and grandmother, then in a council house in Metheringham, with long stays in Coleraine in Northern Ireland from the age of 10, to see his father. He then took degrees in English at the University of Leicester and Durham University.

Career
Waterman teaches at Nottingham Trent University, and co-edits the poetry pamphlet press New Walk Editions, with Nick Everett at the University of Leicester. He is also a critic and reviewer, writing regularly for the Times Literary Supplement, PN Review, and other publications, and the author of several books of literary criticism. His poetry has been shortlisted for a Ledbury Forte Prize and a Seamus Heaney Prize, and has been made a PBS Recommendation.

In addition to his three collections with Carcanet, his poems have appeared in the New Statesman, The Guardian, The Financial Times, and various other magazines and newspapers, as well as a number of anthologies, including The Best British Poetry and The Forward Book of Poetry. The Manchester Review wrote that 'Rory Waterman's first complete collection, Tonight the Summer’s Over was much lauded, seen as "the best first collection for the past couple of years" and was a PBS recommendation. The splendidly titled Brexit Day on the Balmoral Estate is a fine widening out of subject matter.' The TLS, reviewing his second book, commended him for a 'seriousness of form and subject uncommon among his generation', and describes his work as 'subversive – and substantial.' His critical essays have appeared in Essays in Criticism, English, Poetry Review, PN Review, and elsewhere.

Books

Poetry
Sweet Nothings (Carcanet Press, 2020)
Sarajevo Roses (Carcanet Press, 2017) - shortlisted for the Ledbury Forte Prize 2019
Brexit Day on the Balmoral Estate (Rack Press, 2017) - pamphlet
Tonight the Summer's Over (Carcanet Press, 2013) - Poetry Book Society Recommendation, shortlisted for Seamus Heaney Prize 2014

Criticism
Wendy Cope (Liverpool University Press, 2021)
Poets of the Second World War (Liverpool University Press, 2016)
Belonging and Estrangement in the Poetry of Philip Larkin, R. S. Thomas and Charles Causley (Routledge, 2014)

Edited by
with Anthony Caleshu, Poetry & Covid-19 (Shearsman, 2021)
W. H. Davies: Essays on the Super-Tramp Poet (Anthem, 2021)
with David Belbin, 25 (Shoestring, 2019)
Something Happens, Sometimes Here: Contemporary Lincolnshire Poets (Five Leaves, 2015)
W. H. Davies, The True Traveller: A Reader (Carcanet/Fyfield Books, 2015)

References

External links
 
 Carcanet Press author page
 Staff profile at Nottingham Trent University

Academics of Nottingham Trent University
Male poets from Northern Ireland
Living people
Writers from Belfast
1981 births
Male writers from Northern Ireland
21st-century writers from Northern Ireland
21st-century poets from Northern Ireland
Alumni of Durham University